Andrzej Zieliński may refer to:
 Andrzej Zieliński (athlete) (1936–2021), Polish sprinter
 Andrzej Zieliński (artist) (born 1976), American visual artist
  (born 1944), Polish musician and composer; see 
 Andrzej Zieliński (actor) (born 1962), Polish actor
 Andrzej Zieliński (politician), Ministry of Culture and National Heritage (Poland)

See also